The Ebeid Cabinet was the government of Egypt which was led by Prime Minister Atef Ebeid from 5 October 1999 – 14 July 2004. It was succeeded by the Nazif Cabinet.

List of ministers

References

Cabinets of Egypt
1999 establishments in Egypt
2004 disestablishments in Egypt
Cabinets established in 1999
Cabinets disestablished in 2004